Capella Regia Prague, formerly Capella Regia Musicalis, is a Czech early music ensemble founded in 1992 by Robert Hugo. The name Capella Regia Musicalis was in reference to a famous 1693 Czech collection of sacred music by Václav Karel Holan Rovenský.

References

External links
 Website

Early music groups
Czech classical music groups
1992 establishments in Czechoslovakia
Musical groups established in 1992